Reser is a surname. Notable people with the surname include:

Harry Reser (1896–1965), American banjo player and bandleader
Ryan Reser (born 1980), American judoka

See also
 Reiser (disambiguation)#People

Americanized surnames